Eric Slick (born May 15, 1987) is an American singer, songwriter and drummer. He is the drummer of Dr. Dog, performing on their albums Shame, Shame (2010), Be The Void (2012), B-Room (2013), The Psychedelic Swamp (2016) Abandoned Mansion (2016). and Critical Equation (2018). Slick released his debut solo album Palisades on April 21, 2017 to positive reviews from Consequence of Sound, Relix and Tidal, in which Greg Saunier of Deerhoof rated the album "10 out of 10 stars."

Early life

Slick is a native of Philadelphia, Pennsylvania and began playing drums at age 5. As a teenager, he was a student of the original Paul Green School of Rock Music, and appeared with his sister Julie in the 2005 documentary Rock School.

Career 
Aside from Dr. Dog and solo records, Slick has also performed/recorded with Adrian Belew, Nels Cline (Wilco), Daniel Rossen (Grizzly Bear), R. Stevie Moore, Cass McCombs, Ween, and Ruston Kelly; he played drums on the 2021 Taylor Swift track “You All Over Me”, produced by Aaron Dessner.

Slick also operates a vinyl label, Least Records.

On June 24, 2019, Eric Slick took to Twitter to announce his marriage to fellow musician, Natalie Prass. They later collaborated in 2020 on Slick's solo album, Wiseacre (2020) with the feature track, Closer to Heaven.

In 2022, Slick played drums on The Simple Plan EP by August is Falling, a pop-punk, emo-style music project.

Discography

As solo artist
 Out of Habit (2014)
 Four Track Demos Vol. 1 and 2 (2015)
 Palisades (2017)
 Bullfighter EP (2018)
 Wiseacre (2020)

With Lithuania
 Heavy Hands (2010)
 Hardcore Friends (2015)
 White Reindeer (2017)

With August is Falling
 The Simple Plan EP (2022)

References 

1987 births
Living people
American male singer-songwriters
American rock drummers
21st-century American singers
21st-century American drummers
21st-century American male singers
American Babies members
American singer-songwriters